Christophe Vincent (born 8 November 1992) is a French professional footballer who plays as a midfielder for Ligue 2 club Bastia.

Career
Vincent played youth football for GFC Bastia Lucciana and ÉF Bastia, before signing for SC Bastia where he played for two seasons with the B team before graduating to the senior squad. He made his first team debut for the club on 3 October 2011, as a second half substitute in a 3–1 Ligue 2 away win against US Boulogne. On 5 June 2012, it was announced Vincent had signed a three year professional contract with SC Bastia, following their promotion to Ligue 1. In summer 2013 he was loaned to Ligue 2 neighbours CA Bastia for the season.

On 18 June 2015, AC Ajaccio announced the signing of Vincent from Corsican rivals SC Bastia.

In January 2017, Vincent joined Belgian club Cercle Brugge on a year-and-a-half contract. In August 2018, at the end of the contract, he left the club, and in October of the same year re-signed for his first club SC Bastia.

Career statistics

References

External links
 
 
 
 

1992 births
Living people
French footballers
Association football midfielders
Corsica international footballers
Ligue 1 players
Ligue 2 players
Championnat National players
Championnat National 2 players
Championnat National 3 players
Challenger Pro League players
SC Bastia players
CA Bastia players
AC Ajaccio players
Cercle Brugge K.S.V. players
French expatriate footballers
French expatriate sportspeople in Belgium
Expatriate footballers in Belgium
Footballers from Corsica